Princess Myeongan (Hangul: 명안공주, Hanja: 明安公主; 30 June 1665 – 25 June 1687), personal name Yi On-hui, was a Korean princess as the third daughter of Hyeonjong of Joseon and Queen Myeongseong.

Biography 
On December 21, 1671 (12th year of her father's reign), Yi On-hui was honoured as Princess Myeongan (명안공주, 明安公主).

In 1679 (5th year of Sukjong's reign), she married Oh Tae-ju (오태주), a son of Oh Du-in (오두인), who was a key figure of the Seoin faction. Her husband was honoured as Prince Consort Haechang (해창위, 海昌慰) and their formal wedding ceremony was held on December 18, 1680.

The drought being severe at that time, Song Si-yeol (송시열) and others filed an appeal requesting that the Princess's residence be built in a modest way to reduce the size and cost.

One year later, after the Princess's in-laws illegally occupied the mounds and fields in Deoksan, Chungcheong Province, a lawsuit broke out and the King ordered them to return the land.

Princess Myeongan died on June 25, 1687, five days from her birthday at the age of 21 years old, and is buried in Sasa-dong, Ansan, Gyeonggi Province, South Korea.

Family
Father: Hyeonjong of Joseon (14 March 1641 - 17 September 1674) (조선 현종왕)
Grandfather: Hyojong of Joseon (3 July 1619 - 23 June 1659) (조선 효종왕)
Grandmother: Queen Inseon of the Deoksu Jang clan (9 February 1619 - 19 March 1674) (인선왕후 장씨)
Mother: Queen Myeongseong of the Cheongpung Kim clan (13 June 1642 - 21 January 1684) (명성왕후 김씨)
Grandfather: Kim Woo-myeong, Internal Prince Cheongpung (1619 - 1675) (김우명 청풍부원군)
Grandmother: Internal Princess Consort Deokeun of the Eunjin Song clan (1621 - 1660) (덕은부부인 은진 송씨) 
 Siblings
Older sister: Princess Myeongseon (15 November 1659 - 2 August 1673) (명선공주)
Older brother: Sukjong of Joseon (7 October 1661 - 12 July 1720) (조선 숙종왕)
Sister-in-law: Queen Ingyeong of the Gwangsan Kim clan (25 October 1661 - 16 December 1680) (인경왕후 김씨)
Unnamed niece (27 April 1677 - 13 March 1678)
Unnamed niece (23 October 1679 - 1679)
Sister-in-law: Queen Inhyeon of the Yeoheung Min clan (15 May 1667 - 16 September 1701) (인현왕후 민씨)
Sister-in-law: Queen Inwon of the Gyeongju Kim clan (3 November 1687 - 13 May 1757) (인원왕후 김씨)
Older sister: Princess Myeonghye (1665 - 27 April 1673) (명혜공주)
Husband: Oh Tae-ju, Prince Consort Haechang (1668 - 1716) (오태주 해창위)
Father-in-law: Oh Du-in (1624 - 1689) (오두인)
Mother-in-law: Lady Hwang of the Sangju Hwang clan (상주 황씨); Oh Du-in's third wife
Adoptive son: Oh Won, Duke Munmok (1700 - 1740) (오원 문목공)
 Adoptive daughter-in-law - Lady Kwon of the Andong Kwon clan (안동 권씨, 安東權氏)
 Adoptive daughter-in-law - Lady Choi of the Gangneung Choi clan (강릉 최씨, 江陵崔氏)
 Adoptive grandson - Oh Jae-sun (오재순, 吳載純) (1727 - 1792)
 Adoptive granddaughter-in-law - Lady Yi of the Yeonan Yi clan (연안 이씨, 延安李氏)
 Adoptive Great-Grandson - Oh Hui-sang (오희상, 吳煕常) (1763 - 1833)
 Adoptive Great-Great-Granddaughter - Internal Princess Consort Haeryeong of the Haeju Oh clan (해령부부인 해주 오씨, 海寧府夫人 海州 吳氏) (1798 - 15 March 1833)
 Adoptive Great-Grandson - Oh Yeon-sang (오연상, 吳淵常) (1765 1821)
 Adoptive grandson - Oh Jae-so (오재소, 吳載紹) (1729 - 1811)

In popular culture
Portrayed by Cho Ja-young in the 2013 SBS TV series Jang Ok-jung, Living by Love.

References

1665 births
1687 deaths
Princesses of Joseon
17th-century Korean people
17th-century Korean women